Maximum XS is a greatest hits album by the Scottish hard rock group Nazareth, released in 2004. Most of the songs are alternate or live versions that do not appear on other albums.

Track listing

Disc 1
 "Razamanaz" (Alternate edit)
 "Broken Down Angel"
 "Turn on Your Receiver"
 "Shapes of Things" (Single edit)
 "Hair of the Dog" (Single edit)
 "Love Hurts"
 "Telegram" (Edited version)
 "I Want To (Do Everything for You)"
 "Expect No Mercy" (live)
 "Star"
 "Big Boy"
 "Pop the Silo"
 "Boys in the Band"
 "This Month's Messiah"
 "Hit the Fan"
 "Piece of My Heart"
 "Every Time It Rains"
 "When the Lights Come Down" (Live)
 "Walk by Yourself"

Disc 2
 "Morning Dew" (alternate edited version)
 "This Flight Tonight" (US version)
 "Shanghai'd in Shanghai" (US single edit)
 "Holy Roller" (alternate mix)
 "My White Bicycle" (original single version)
 "Carry Out Feelings" (US single edit)
 "I Don't Want To Go on Without You" (alternate edit)
 "Place in Your Heart" (alternate edited version)
 "May the Sunshine" (single edit)
 "Holiday" (single edit)
 "Dressed to Kill" (single edit)
 "Dream On" (single edit)
 "Where Are You Now" (alternate edit)
 "Ruby Tuesday" (extended single mix)
 "Cinema" (edited version)
 "Hang on to a Dream" (single edit)
 "Hire and Fire" (edited version)
 "Let Me Be Your Dog" (edited version)
 "Love Hurts" (rock orchestra version)

External links
 MusicBrainz – Link

2004 greatest hits albums
Nazareth (band) albums